Multiracial democracy is a democratic political system that is multiracial. It is cited as aspiration in South Africa after apartheid and as existing for the United States.

See also 

 Cultural mosaic
 Ethnopluralism
 Intercultural relations
 Multicultural education
 Multiculturalism
 Multinational state
 Multiracialism
 Polyculturalism
 Racial democracy

References

Multiracial affairs
Types of democracy